Nahomis de la Caridad Mustelier Hernández (born 8 September 2000) is a Cuban handball player for Santiago de Cuba and the Cuban national team.

She represented Cuba at the 2019 World Women's Handball Championship.

References

2000 births
Living people
Cuban female handball players
21st-century Cuban women